Alfred Park (15 April 1840 – 16 January 1924) was an Australian cricketer. He played three first-class matches for New South Wales between 1861/62 and 1868/69.

See also
 List of New South Wales representative cricketers

References

External links
 

1840 births
1924 deaths
Australian cricketers
New South Wales cricketers
Cricketers from Tasmania